Ronald Allen Reis (born April 26, 1970) is an American professional wrestler. He is best known for his appearances with World Championship Wrestling between 1995 and 1998 under the ring names The Yeti and Reese.

Early life
Ron Reis is the son of Ron Reis, Sr., who was a member of National Collegiate Athletic Association title-winning basketball teams in 1961 and 1962 while studying at the University of Cincinnati.

Reis attended Monta Vista High School in Cupertino, California. He played on the school's basketball team, scoring 2,082 points and competing in the 1987 Central Coast Section championship. Reis went on to attend Santa Clara University, where he played basketball for four years.

Professional wrestling career

Early career (1994–1995)
Ron Reis was trained by Big John Studd. He made his professional debut on March 12, 1994 for the New England-based International Wrestling Federation under his birth name. In 1995, Reis began performing for the Las Vegas-based National Wrestling Conference as "SWAT".

World Championship Wrestling (1995–1998)
Reis debuted in World Championship Wrestling on Monday Nitro, October 23, 1995, as The Yeti - the Dungeon of Doom's so-called "insurance policy" for the upcoming WCW World Heavyweight Championship match between Dungeon member The Giant and current champion Hulk Hogan at Halloween Havoc 1995. Initially introduced (supposedly) frozen inside a block of ice, the Yeti soon broke out of the ice to reveal a heavily bandaged appearance reminiscent of a huge mummy and went on to interfere in the Halloween Havoc 1995 main event, where he and The Giant attacked Hulk Hogan with a double-bearhug. Reis wore lifts in his boots at the event and had bandages wrapped high on his head, which gave the effect of The Yeti appearing noticeably taller than The Giant (in reality Reis is only around an inch taller than Wight) and caused an astonished Tony Schiavone to remark "The Yeti is taller than The Giant!".

Following Halloween Havoc, The Yeti's ring attire was changed to resemble a masked ninja. However Reis only made three more appearances as the character; as an entrant in the 60-man battle royal at World War 3 1995, in a match against Barry Houston on WCW Prime, and in a match against WCW United States Heavyweight Champion One Man Gang on WCW Saturday Night in January 1996, where Reis' character was renamed The Super Giant Ninja. This would be the final appearance of the character.

Reis later became known as Big Ron Studd in 1996, and WCW announcers billed Reis as having taken the surname of his trainer Big John Studd. In his column in WCW Magazine, Bobby Heenan, who had managed John Studd, expressed disdain over this angle. WCW primarily used the Studd character as an enhancement talent.

On October 21, 1996 edition of Nitro he was defeated by Jeff Jarrett.

On the March 2, 1998 edition of Nitro, Reis joined Raven's Flock as Reese. Raven claimed that Reis' size had made him an outcast from society, leading him to seek acceptance within the Flock. Reis acted as Raven's enforcer, though he was unable to prevent Goldberg defeating Raven for the WCW United States Heavyweight Championship. He also suffered a loss to Juventud Guerrera at the 1998 Great American Bash. Reese's last appearance was on the June 29, 1998 episode of Nitro. Saturn pinned Reese with a Death Valley Driver.

Turnbuckle Championship Wrestling and Japan (2002–2005)
After being released, Reis toured Japan as Big Bomb Jones (a take on Big Van Vader) throughout 2002. In 2003, he returned to America and began working for Dusty Rhodes' Turnbuckle Championship Wrestling promotion, returning to the Big Ron Studd gimmick. He formed a tag team with Glacier, and they won the TCW Tag Team Championships on January 3, 2004. The titles were vacated later that year.

Reis reemerged in Vince Russo's Christian-oriented Ring Of Glory Wrestling promotion in 2005 as the abstract character Evil, losing to Joshua the Carpenter on February 26.

Filmography
Shadow Warriors II: Hunt for the Death Merchant (1999) as "Vlassi"

Championships and accomplishments
Turnbuckle Championship Wrestling
TCW Tag Team Championship (1 time) - with Glacier

References

External links
 
 

1970 births
American male professional wrestlers
Basketball players from San Jose, California
Centers (basketball)
Fictional mummies
Fictional ninja
Living people
People from Cumming, Georgia
Professional wrestlers from California
Santa Clara Broncos men's basketball players
Sportspeople from San Jose, California
American men's basketball players